Reaktor is a technology company, specialised in design and development of digital services and products.

Founded in Finland in 2000, Reaktor has offices in New York, Amsterdam, Helsinki, Stockholm, and Tokyo. Reaktor employs over 550 people. In 2020, its revenue amounted to 100.1 million euro, approximately $105M. Reaktor Group’s CEO is Sampo Pasanen and the firm is 100% employee-owned.

Reaktor builds digital products for clients including Finnair, Finavia, HBO, Adidas, Nasdaq, and Varian Medical Systems. Its work has been awarded and recognized by the Red Dot awards, Webby Awards, Emmy Awards, and German Design Council, among others.

In 2019, Reaktor was named as one of the World’s Most Innovative Companies by the American business journal Fast Company.

Reaktor is known from being the creator of Elements of AI massive open online course (MOOC) with the University of Helsinki. The online course about artificial intelligence has been taken to over half a million participants worldwide.

Initiatives 
In 2020, Fast Company listed Reaktor Education and the +POOL project in New York among world-changing ideas.

In 2019, Reaktor partnered with Columbia University and +POOL to build an installation in East River in New York. Named +POOL Light, the sculpture changes colors based on water conditions that are tracked by sensors and algorithms by the university and Reaktor.

In 2018, Reaktor launched Finland’s first commercially-built nanosatellite “Reaktor Hello World” into space. The nanosatellite carries an infrared hyperspectral camera built by VTT Technical Research Centre of Finland. The satellite was built in collaboration with Aalto University and the same people who were behind the launch of Finland’s first two satellites, Aalto 1 and Aalto 2. Reaktor’s satellite platform is also used in the W-cube satellite by ESA, European Space Agency.

Elements of AI is a massive open online course (MOOC) designed and organized by Reaktor and the University of Helsinki. The course teaches the basics of artificial intelligence, and it was originally launched in 2018. With over half a million participants, the course is being translated into all official EU languages. The government of Finland has pledged to offer the course for all EU citizens by the end of 2021. In 2019, the course won the global grand prize in the Inclusive Innovation Challenge by the Massachusetts Institute of Technology.

Reaktor has also held the world’s first coding championships in 2014 together with the Finnish game developer Supercell.

References 

2000 establishments in Finland
Finnish companies established in 2000
Software companies of Finland